The 2022 BNXT League Dutch Playoffs is the national playoffs of the Netherlands as part of the 2021–22 BNXT League season. The playoffs will determine which team is crowned the Dutch national basketball champion. Eliminated teams advance to the BNXT Playoffs, were they play for the BNXT title. The playoffs started on 3 May 2022.

Playoff qualifying

Bracket

Quarterfinals
The semifinals were played in a best-of-three format.

Donar vs Aris Leeuwarden

Landstede Hammers vs Feyenoord

Semifinals
The semifinals were played in a best-of-five format.

Heroes Den Bosch vs Donar

ZZ Leiden vs Landstede Hammers

Final
The finals will be played in a best of five format.

ZZ Leiden vs Heroes Den Bosch

Winning roster 
Source:

Notes

References

External links
Official website 

BNXT League